Ngong Road is a major road in Kenya that links the city of Nairobi to Ngong town. It runs from the Nairobi central business district all the way to the Ngong Stadium, passing by major places in Nairobi and Ngong such as the Kenyatta National Hospital, The Junction Mall, the Lang'ata Road roundabout in Karen and the Ngong Market.

The road is currently a standard carriageway with two traffic lanes, but the Kenyan government plans to turn the road into a four-lane dual carriageway by February 2015, with financing from the Japan International Cooperation Agency, at a cost of KSh.1.68 billion/= (approx. US$19.35 million, £11.47 million sterling or €13.95 million), as part the Vision 2030 project. However, the completion date of the project has been publicly questioned, as the project has not even began as of May 2014.

See also
 Nairobi Bypasses
 Ngong Forest

References 

Roads in Kenya	
Streets in Nairobi
Kajiado County
Transport in Rift Valley Province
Japan International Cooperation Agency